The following vessels were in commission, planned or under construction for Imperial Iranian Navy in 1979.

Overview 

As of 1978–1979, Iranian Navy had the following equipment according to The Statesman's Yearbook:

Commissioned vessels

Planned vessels

References

 
 
 

Iranian military-related lists
1979 in military history
1979 in Iran